The Cameroon olive pigeon (Columba sjostedti) is a species of bird in the family Columbidae. It is found in the Cameroon line (including  Bioko).

References

Cameroon olive pigeon
Birds of Central Africa
Cameroon olive pigeon
Taxonomy articles created by Polbot